In the U.S. state of Nevada, U.S. Route 93 (US 93) is a major United States Numbered Highway traversing the eastern edge of the state. The highway connects the Las Vegas area to the Great Basin National Park, and provides further connections to Ely and Wells. US 93 also provides the majority of the most direct connection from the major metropolitan areas of Las Vegas and Phoenix (via Boulder City, Kingman and Wickenburg with a final link to Phoenix via US 60) to the Boise, Idaho metropolitan area (with a final connection to Boise via Interstate 84 from Twin Falls, Idaho).

Route description

U.S. Route 93 in Nevada is known as the Great Basin Highway from Interstate 15 in North Las Vegas to Interstate 80 in Wells. It begins at the Mike O'Callaghan–Pat Tillman Memorial Bridge in Boulder City. The highway overlaps U.S. Route 95 from State Route 173 in Boulder City to Interstate 15 in downtown Las Vegas. It runs to the Las Vegas Valley passing through the cities of Henderson, Las Vegas and North Las Vegas. US 93 merges with Interstate 15 at the Spaghetti Bowl interchange and overlaps I-15 for approximately 21 miles. After overlapping I-15, US 93 heads northwest towards Alamo.

Near Crystal Springs, US 93 curves right while intersecting State Routes 318 and 375. US 93 continues east to mountainous terrain to the town of Caliente. The highway turns left to go north to Pioche. 80 miles later, the highway turns left at an intersection with U.S. Routes 6 and 50. From State Route 318 to the US Routes 6 and 50 intersection, the highway is a Nevada Scenic Byway. Near Ely, the three U.S. routes separate. US 6 turns left before the intersection US 50 and 93 separate, heading southwest. US 50 and 93 separate, with route 50 heading northwest towards Austin, Nevada and route 93 heading northeast.

At Lages Station, US 93 turns left, while US 93 Alternate continues straight. In Wells, US 93 intersects Interstate 80. The highway continues into Idaho after passing through Jackpot. Between Ely and Wells there are no services for 136 miles.

History

Establishment
U.S. Route 93 was not one of the original U.S. highways proposed in the 1925 Bureau of Public Roads plan. However, the revised numbering plan approved by the American Association of State Highway Officials (AASHO) on November 11, 1926 established US 93 from the Canada–US border near Eureka, Montana south through Montana and Idaho to a southern terminus at Wells, Nevada. The establishment of the highway was reflected on Nevada's 1927 official highway map.

AASHO, at its June 8, 1931 meeting, approved a southerly extension of US 93 south to Glendale, Nevada. By 1932, the Nevada Department of Highways had marked the continuation of the highway using the routing of several preexisting state highways as follows:
From Wells, US 93 continued southeast along the remainder of SR 13 to its terminus at Lages Station.
At Lages Station, the highway turned south, overlapping the southern portion of State Route 24 to Magnuson's Ranch.
The highway was then routed concurrently along the entirety of the nearly  State Route 7, running southeast from Ely through Connor's Pass, south through Pioche to Caliente, west to Crystal Springs and then southeast through Alamo and Moapa before terminating at U.S. Route 91/State Route 6 in Glendale.

At the request of the Arizona State Highway Department, the AASHO route numbering committee approved another extension of US 93 in 1935. This shifted the southern terminus south to Kingman, Arizona by way of Las Vegas.  However, Nevada officials may not have signed the extension of US 93 right away, since it was not shown on state-published maps until 1939. The highway was again extended along existing highways:
From Glendale, US 93 followed US 91/SR 6 southwest  to Las Vegas.
At Alunite, US 93 and US 466 turned to follow State Route 26 east for  into Boulder City.
In Boulder City, the combined US Routes dropped SR 26 and gained State Route 42 for the final  journey towards Boulder Dam and into Arizona.
The entire highway within Nevada was paved by 1939.

Route changes
After US 93 was extended to Arizona in the 1930s, the route remained unchanged for many years. A  concurrency with U.S. Route 95 between Las Vegas and Alunite was added in 1940, when that highway was extended through southern Nevada along State Route 5.

The old section of US 93 northwest of Glendale paralleling the Muddy River remained as State Route 7, and was renumbered in 1976 to State Route 168.

In 1982, a "truck bypass" along the upper reaches of Hemenway Wash, to skirt the central portion of Boulder City and allow a straighter, more steady climb for commercial vehicles, was nearing completion. But by the time this new route opened, it had been signed as mainline US 93, with the old, winding route of US 93 on the Nevada Highway (original SR 26) through town being changed to SR 500. This state highway designation was later dropped and that roadway is now maintained by Boulder City as "Nevada Way". The western end of this 1982 bypass was also later realigned from Colorado Street south to intersect directly at Buchanan Boulevard (in place of a wye intersection with Nevada Way a block to the east at Joshua Street), by using a small portion of abandoned railroad right-of-way. A shopping center now sits where the original truck bypass alignment once ran.

US 93 was realigned again on October 19, 2010, when the Mike O'Callaghan–Pat Tillman Memorial Bridge over the Black Canyon of the Colorado River opened to vehicular traffic. With that, the highway no longer passes over Hoover Dam, and the state-maintained portion of the replaced route was renamed as Hoover Dam Access Road (SR 172). In 2011, US 93 from Buchanan Boulevard to the Nevada terminus of the Hoover Dam Bypass was expanded to four through lanes with dedicated turn lanes at major intersections to better handle increased traffic loads from the Hoover Dam Bypass until its long-planned companion freeway around Boulder City was completed in 2018.

On August 9, 2018, US 93 was rerouted onto the Boulder City Bypass around the historic town. The most recent previous alignment (1982–2018) through the heart of Boulder City and along Hemenway Wash has now been re-signed as U.S. Route 93 Business.

Major intersections

Note: Mileposts in Nevada reset at county lines; the start and end mileposts for each county are given in the county column.

Special routes
 U.S. Route 93 Alternate
 U.S. Route 93 Business

See also

 List of U.S. Routes in Nevada

References

External links

U.S. Route 93 in Nevada @ AARoads

093
Transportation in Clark County, Nevada
Transportation in Lincoln County, Nevada
Transportation in Elko County, Nevada
Transportation in White Pine County, Nevada
93
 Nevada